Ceanothus maritimus, with the common name maritime ceanothus, is a species of shrub in the buckthorn family Rhamnaceae. It is endemic to San Luis Obispo County, California, where it is known from only a few occurrences in the vicinity of Hearst Ranch. It shares the same range as the similarly rare Ceanothus hearstiorum, growing on the coastal bluffs.

Description
The Ceanothus maritimus is a spreading or ascending shrub under a meter in height with reddish gray bark aging to gray. The firm evergreen leaves are oppositely arranged, each oval or oblong in shape with a pointed, flat, or notched tip. The leaves are under 2 centimeters long, shiny green on top and woolly underneath, with their edges curled under and sometimes toothed. The inflorescence is a small cluster of deep blue to off-white flowers. The fruit is a capsule about 6 millimeters long which is generally rounded with tiny horns on top.

References

External links
Jepson Manual Treatment - Ceanothus maritimus
USDA Plants Profile
Ceanothus maritimus - Photo gallery

maritimus
Endemic flora of California
Natural history of the California chaparral and woodlands
Natural history of San Luis Obispo County, California
Plants described in 1953